Pseudochromis melas, the dark dottyback, is a species of ray-finned fish 
from the Western Indian Ocean: From Kenya south to the Natal, South Africa, which is a member of the family Pseudochromidae.

References

Smith, M.M., 1986. Pseudochromidae. p. 539-541. In M.M. Smith and P.C. Heemstra (eds.) Smiths' sea fishes. Springer-Verlag, Berlin. 

melas
Taxa named by Roger Lubbock
Fish described in 1977
Fish of the Indian Ocean